Lieutenant Colonel Robert Algernon Smith-Dorrien  (born Robert Algernon Smith) was a British churchwarden and soldier.

Biography 

Robert Smith was born on 2 October 1814 to James Smith and Mary Isabella Pechell. He married Mary Anne Drever, a member of the Dorrien family, in 1845. He adopted his wife's maiden name and changed his surname by Royal Licence to Smith-Dorrien. Together they had 15 children, including Thomas Smith-Dorrien and Horace Smith-Dorrien.

He served as a Justice of the Peace and was a Lieutenant Colonel, serving in the Hertfordshire Militia. He also was a Captain in both the 3rd Light Dragoons and the 16th Lancers.

Smith-Dorrien was heavily involved in the restoration of the now Grade II* listed St Peter's Church in Berkhamsted, Hertfordshire, serving as the Churchwarden from 1868 until his death on 8 October 1879. Due to his work for the church building, a stained glass window by Charles Eamer Kempe was installed and dedicated in his honour, along with a plaque.

Family 
Smith-Dorrien's elder brother was Augustus Smith, Lord Proprietor of the Isles of Scilly from 1834 to 1872. Augustus Smith was succeeded as Lord Proprietor by Robert Smith-Dorrien's eldest son, Thomas Algernon Smith-Dorrien.

References 

1814 births
1879 deaths
19th-century British Army personnel
Churchwardens
Dorrien and Smith-Dorrien family
English justices of the peace
Hertfordshire Militia officers
People from Berkhamsted